Kaari is an 2022 Indian Tamil-language sports action drama film written and directed by Hemanth in his directorial debut and produced by S. Lakshman Kumar under the banner of Prince Pictures. The film stars M. Sasikumar, Parvathy Arun, J. D. Chakravarthy and Balaji Sakthivel, with Aadukalam Naren, Ammu Abhirami, Redin Kingsley and Nagineedu in supporting roles. The film features music composed by D. Imman, whilst cinematography and editing were handled respectively by Ganesh Chandhrra and T. Shivanandeeswaran.

This is a eighth collaboration of Sasikumar and Namo Naryana after Naadodigal, Poraali, Kutti Puli, Asuravadham, Naadodigal 2, Udanpirappe, MGR Magan and Raajavamsam and Sasikumar's first collaboration with Hemanth. The film were predominantly shot in Chennai and Ramanathapuram.

The film was released in theatres on 25 November 2022.

Plot

A champion race jockey, a multi millionaire, and a simple village girl, these three characters and the rustic villagers of Kariyoor are so apart and distant that they don’t know each other until one day their lives change when fate brings them on a direct collision course. The ensuing screenplay is a race of action, stunts, and events that roller coaster though high emotion, pain, love, betrayal and sacrifice.

Cast

M. Sasikumar as Sethu
Parvathy Arun as Meena
J. D. Chakravarthy as SKR
Balaji Sakthivel as Meena's father
Aadukalam Naren as Vellasaamy, Sethu's father
Ammu Abhirami as Sethu's friend
Redin Kingsley as Sethu's friend
Nagineedu
Ramkumar Ganesan as Sethu's coach
Samyuktha Shanmuganathan as SKR's wife
Prem as Sethu's friend
Namo Narayana
Arunmozhithevan as village villain in Jallikattu

Production
The film was tentatively titled as Sasikumar22. On 29 March 2022, the film's official title was unveiled as Kaari. Sasikumar, will be playing the role of champion race jockey in this film. Actress Parvathy Arun was chosen as the female lead in this film marking her first collaboration with Sasikumar.

Music

D. Imman composed the soundtrack and background score of the film while collaborating with actor Sasikumar for fourth time after Vetrivel, Kennedy Club and Udanpirappe and director Hemanth for first time. The audio rights were acquired by Sony Music India. The first single "Goppamavaney" was released on 30 March 2022. The second single "Saanjikkava" was released on 14 June 2022. The third single "Engum Oli Pirakkumay" was released on 1 July 2022.

Release

Theatrical
The trailer of the film was released on 17 June 2022. The film was released in theatres on 25 November 2022.

Home media
The post-theatrical streaming rights of the film was bought by ZEE5 and the satellite rights of the film was bought by Zee Tamil and Zee Thirai. It premiered on ZEE5 on December 23, 2022.

Reception
Logesh Balachandran of The Times of India rated the film 3 out of 5 stars and wrote "Kaari is interesting and engaging in parts, but it isn't impactful enough for the audience to remember." Dinamalar rated the film 2 out of 5 stars. A critic for News18 wrote "On the technical front, including cinematography and music, Kaari doesn’t disappoint. Ganesh Chandra’s camerawork is brilliant in this Tamil film." Navein Darshan of Cinema Express wrote "But ironically, the tasteful ingredients in Kaari don't blend well together as a wholesome dish." A critic from Hindu Tamil Thisai gave the film 3 out of 5 stars and wrote "In D. Imman’s music, the songs and background score help to carry the heavy story with ease." A critic for Cinema Vikatan wrote that "If only one issue had been approached with more depth and clarity of understanding, this Kaari would have been furious!"

References

External links
 
Kaari on ZEE5

2022 films
Films shot in Chennai
2020s Tamil-language films
Indian sports drama films
2020s sports drama films
2022 directorial debut films
2022 action drama films